Fusiturricula springvaleensis is an extinct species of sea snail, a marine gastropod mollusk in the family Drilliidae.

Description
The shell grows to a length of 44 mm, its diameter 15 mm.

Distribution
This extinct species was found in Miocene strata of Trinidad and Tobago and in Pliocene strata of Venezuela; age range: 5.332 to 2.588 Ma.

References

 W. C. Mansfield. 1925. Miocene gastropods and scaphopods from Trinidad, British West Indies. Proceedings of the United States National Museum 66(22):9116-9125
 B. Landau and C. Marques da Silva. 2010. Early Pliocene gastropods of Cubagua, Venezuela: Taxonomy, palaeobiogeography and ecostratigraphy. Palaeontos 19:1–221

External links

springvaleensis
Gastropods described in 1925
Extinct gastropods